Walter James Bird (10 January 1863 – 9 December 1953) was an organ builder based in Birmingham, England.

Life

He was born in Birmingham on 10 January 1863, the son of Thomas and Sarah Bird and christened on 1 February in St. Thomas' Church, Birmingham. He married Ellen Oakes on 5 October 1884 in the same church, and they had the following children:
Walter H Bird (b 1878)
Amelia M Bird (b. 1886)
Harold Bird (b. 1888)
Elsie Lucy S Bird (b.1890)

He trained as an organ builder with Edward James Bossward in Birmingham and took over his business in 1883. He built, repaired and maintained many organs in the vicinity. In 1904 he was based at 81 Latimer Street, Birmingham.

He died on 9 December 1953.

Works

He installed organs at the following churches
St Bartholomew's Church, Allen's Cross 1888
St. Thomas' Church, Birmingham 1893 enlargement
Emmanuel Church, Broad Street, Birmingham 1896
St John's Church, Deritend 1906
Knowle Parish Church
St Paul's Church, Dosthill 1914
St Andrew's Church of England, Handsworth, Birmingham 1926

References

1863 births
1953 deaths
Organ builders of the United Kingdom
People from Birmingham, West Midlands
Place of death missing
Musical instrument manufacturing companies of the United Kingdom